180 is a year.

180 may also refer to:

180 (number)
180 (video game), a 1986 darts video game
180 (2011 American film)
180 (2011 Indian film)
180 (album), a 2013 album by Palma Violets 
One Eighty, a 1980 album by Ambrosia
The 180, a 2013–2017 Canadian radio talk show
U-turn or 180
180, a trick in extreme sports in which a rider rotates half a turn while airborne and lands

See also

180° (disambiguation)
 List of highways numbered 180
Flight 180, an alternate name for Final Destination (2000)
 
 18O (disambiguation) (one-eight-o; 18o)
 l80 (disambiguation) (L-eight-zero; l80)
 I80 (disambiguation) (i-eight-zero; I80)